Muan County (Muan-gun) is a county in South Jeolla Province (Jeollanam-do), South Korea. In 2005, Muan County became the capital of Jeollanam-do following the transfer of the provincial office from its previous location, Gwangju to the village of Namak in Muan. Muan International Airport was opened here, and will eventually replace the airports in Gwangju and Mokpo.

Modern history
On January 1 of 1963, several villages (ri in Korean) were incorporated into Mokpo city and huge reorganization was made by Korean government. In 1979, Muan township was promoted to a township (eup of South Korea). In 1980, Illo was also promoted into a township.

Symbols
 Flower : The Chrysanthemum
 Tree : The Zelkova tree
 Bird : The white Heron

Location
Muan County is located on the western tip of the South Western part of the Korean peninsula. It acts as the primary link between Sinan county with the rest of the Korean mainland. Numerous beaches are also found on Muan's coast.

Muan borders Yeongsan river with Naju and Hampyeong to the north, Yeongam to the east, Mokpo to the south. These surroundings have influenced the industrial and cultural structure of Muan County.

Enterprise city
Muan was designated an enterprise city by the South Korean government for the Honam region (Southwest). The South Korean government and China have agreed to develop an industrial complex in a joint venture. It was reported that the Chinese government officially promised to invest in and help establish the complex area, which includes the construction of a college and distribution warehouses among other things such as a Chinatown for expatriates.

Mud
Muan includes a large area of mudlands. The western area of the Korean peninsula has a large amount of mud thanks to the Rias coast. However, many mudlands have been destroyed or reclaimed for expanding city areas or industrial complexes.

The mudlands of Muan were designated one of the wetlands of the Ramsar Convention.

In the Muan mudflats, tourists can not enter the sea without permission to protect the mudflats. But, tourists can see the road that opens like the " Miracle of Moses " to reveal its face when the tide falls twice a day.

Festival
Muan is widely known for its White Lotus Festival located in Illo-eup.  The festival occurs in mid August when the white lotus flowers bloom fully onsite at the Hoesan White Lotus Pond. Tourists can walk into the huge lotuslands via the many bridges that crisscross the water. Visitors may also ride the 'duck boats.'

Products
Muan is known for several famous products characteristic of the area. They are largely farming goods from onions to lotus products. Muan puts out 16% of the national onion production making its production volume the largest in Korea.

Muan county officially reported to host farming cluster of sweet potato, onion and lotus plants. The powder of lotus plants is used for making noodles.

Education
Muan County is the site of Mokpo National University, situated in Cheonggye township.

Climate

Transportation

Expressway 
 Seohaean Expressway
 Namhae Expressway
 Muan–Gwangju Expressway

National Route 
 National Route 1
 National Route 2
 National Route 24
 National Route 77

Railway 
 Honam Line

Airport 
 Muan International Airport

Sister cities
  Uiryeong, South Gyeongsang
  Gunpo, Gyeonggi
  Dobong-gu, Seoul
  Taizhou, Zhejiang, China
  Kitanagoya, Aichi, Japan
  Denizli, Turkey

References

External links

 County government home page (in Korean)

 
Counties of South Jeolla Province